Field hockey in Great Britain is governed by Great Britain Hockey. The organisation focuses on international competition only.

Governance
GB Hockey administers the National Men's and Women's hockey teams for both Great Britain and the home nations during competition such as the Olympic Games, Hockey World Cup and other international events.

Domestic competitions are organised on the home nation basis by England Hockey, Scottish Hockey, Welsh Hockey, and Irish Hockey.

National teams

Great Britain
Great Britain men's national field hockey team
Great Britain women's national field hockey team
Home nations
England men's national field hockey team
England women's national field hockey team
Scotland men's national field hockey team
Scotland women's national field hockey team
Wales men's national field hockey team
Wales women's national field hockey team
Ireland men's national field hockey team
Ireland women's national field hockey team

Tournaments hosted

Great Britain Super League
The Great Britain Super League was established by Great Britain Hockey in 2007 as a showcase for British hockey talent. The event was shortlived running from 2007 until 2012 and is now defunct. The inaugural teams were from England (Wessex Leopards, Saxon Tigers and Pennine Pumas), Scotland (Caledonian Cougars and Highland Jaguars) and Wales (Celtic Panthers) competing. Players from the national leagues represented their relevant region.

Winners

Men's Super League

Women's Super League

See also
Field hockey in England
Field hockey in Scotland
Field hockey in Wales
Field hockey in Ireland (all-Ireland)

Notes

References